Lieutenant General Sir William Francis Butler  (31 October 18387 June 1910) was an Irish 19th-century British Army officer, writer, and adventurer.

Military career

He was born at Ballyslatteen, Golden, County Tipperary, Ireland, the son of Richard and Ellen Butler. The great famine of 1847 and scenes of suffering and eviction were amongst his earliest recollections. He was educated chiefly by the Jesuits at Tullabeg College.

He entered the army as an ensign of the 69th Foot at Fermoy Barracks in 1858, becoming captain in 1872 and major in 1874. He took part with distinction in the Red River expedition (1870–71) and the Ashanti operations of 1873–74 under Wolseley and received the Companion of the Order of the Bath in 1874.

He married on 11 June 1877 Elizabeth Thompson, an accomplished painter of battle scenes, notably The Roll Call (1874), Quatre Bras (1875), Rorke's Drift (1881), The Camel Corps (1891), and The Dawn of Waterloo (1895).  They had six children. His daughter, Elizabeth Butler, married Lt.-Col. Randolph Albert Fitzhardinge Kingscote (6 Feb 18678 Dec 1940) on 24 July 1903.

He again served with General Wolseley in the Zulu War (as brevet lieutenant colonel), the campaign of Tel-el-Kebir (after which he was made an aide-de-camp to the Queen) and the Sudan in 1884–86, being employed as colonel on the staff 1885 and brigadier-general 1885–86. In the latter year, he was made a Knight Commander of the Order of the Bath. He served as brigadier-general on the staff in Egypt until 1892 when he was promoted to major-general and stationed at Aldershot, subsequent to which he was given command of the South-Eastern District in March 1896.

In 1898 he succeeded General William Howley Goodenough as commander-in-chief in South Africa, with the local rank of lieutenant-general. For a short period (December 1898February 1899), during the absence of Sir Alfred Milner in England, he acted as high commissioner, and as such, and subsequently in his military capacity, he expressed views on the subject of the probabilities of war which were not approved by the home government; he was consequently ordered home to command the Western District, and held this post until 1905. He also held the Aldershot Command for a brief period from 1900 to 1901. Sir William Butler was promoted to lieutenant-general in 1900 and continued to serve, finally leaving the King's service in 1905.

In October 1905, having reached the age limit of sixty-seven, he was placed on the retired list. The few years of life which remained to him he spent at Bansha Castle in Ireland, devoted chiefly to the cause of education. He was a frequent lecturer both in Dublin and the provinces on historical, social, and economic questions. Butler was known as a Home Ruler and an admirer of Charles Stewart Parnell. He was a member of the Senate of the National University of Ireland, and a commissioner of the Board of National Education. In June 1906, he was appointed Knight of the Grand Cross of the Order of the Bath, and in 1909 he was made a member of the Irish Privy Council. He died at Bansha Castle and was buried at the cemetery of Killaldriffe, a few miles distant and not far from his ancestral home.

He had long been known as a descriptive writer, since his publication of The Great Lone Land (1872), describing the Red River Expedition in suppression of the Red River Rebellion, and subsequent travel across Western Canada for the Government, to report on conditions there.  Other works include biographies of Charles George Gordon (1889) and Sir George Colley (1899). In his biography of Gordon, he wrote the epigram "The nation that will insist upon drawing a broad line of demarcation between the fighting man and the thinking man is liable to find its fighting done by fools and its thinking by cowards.":85 which has since frequently been misattributed to Thucydides.

He had started work on his autobiography a few years before his death but died before it was completed. His youngest daughter, Eileen, Viscountess Gormanston, completed the work and had it published in 1911.  Eileen found among his papers a poem he had written, which began:

Give me but six-foot-three (one inch to spare)
Of Irish earth, and dig it anywhere;
And for my poor soul say an Irish prayer
Above the spot.

Notes

Works

References
William Francis Butler (1872). The Great Lone Land; a Narrative of Travel and Adventure in the North-West of America. London.
 William Francis Butler (1873). The Wild North Land: Being the Story of a Winter Journey, with Dogs, Across Northern North America. London.
 William Francis Butler (1882). Red Cloud, the Solitary Sioux: A Story of the Great Prairie. Roberts Brothers, Boston.
 Lieut.-General The Rt. Hon. Sir W. F. Butler G.C.B. (1911). Sir William Butler. An Autobiography Scribner's Sons, New York.
 Eileen Gormanston; Atkins (1953). A Little Kept. London & New York.
 Edward Alexander McCourt (1967). Remember Butler. The Story of Sir William Butler. Toronto.
 Martin Ryan (2003) William Francis Butler, a life 1838–1910. Dublin.

External links

 
 Biography at the ''Dictionary of Canadian Biography Online
 
 

|-

|-

1838 births
1910 deaths
Military personnel from County Tipperary
19th-century Anglo-Irish people
Irish writers
Knights Grand Cross of the Order of the Bath
69th Regiment of Foot officers
British Army lieutenant generals
British Army personnel of the Mahdist War
British Army personnel of the Anglo-Egyptian War
British Army personnel of the Anglo-Zulu War
British military personnel of the Third Anglo-Ashanti War
People of the Red River Rebellion
Governors of the Cape Colony
Irish biographers
Irish male non-fiction writers
Irish male writers
Male biographers
Irish officers in the British Army
19th-century travel writers
Irish travel writers
People educated at St Stanislaus College
People from County Tipperary
Members of the Privy Council of Ireland